Russell River is a national park in North Queensland, Australia, 1352 km northwest of Brisbane. The park protects a coastal strip between the sea and the Russell River.  It is part of the Coastal Wet Tropics Important Bird Area, identified as such by BirdLife International because of its importance for the conservation of lowland tropical rainforest birds.

Camping is allowed with a camping permit, but the park itself has no visitor facilities.

See also

 Protected areas of Queensland

References

External links
 Russell River National Park at Queensland's Department of National Parks, Recreation, Sport and Racing

National parks of Far North Queensland
Protected areas established in 1969
1969 establishments in Australia
Important Bird Areas of Queensland